Fan Kuang-yao (born 3 May 1975) is a Taiwanese actor and xiangsheng performer. He has been nominated for three Golden Bell Awards and won once in 2005.

Selected filmography
Lust, Caution (2007)
Night Market Hero (2011)
Amour et Pâtisserie (2013)
Endless Nights in Aurora (2014)
A Touch of Green (2015)
Where the Wind Settles (2015)
10,000 Miles (2016)

References

1975 births
Living people
Taiwanese male stage actors
Taiwanese male film actors
Taiwanese male television actors
21st-century Taiwanese male actors
Taiwanese male comedians
Taiwanese xiangsheng performers